Football at the 1973 Maccabiah Games was held in Israel starting on 10 July.

The competition was open for men's teams only. Teams from 13 countries participated. The competition was won by Israel, who was represented by its U-20 team.

As part of the closing ceremony, an exhibition match was played between Israel and Uruguay, which ended with a 2–1 victory to the visitors.

Format
The 13 teams were divided into four groups, one group of four and three groups of three, with each team playing the others once. The top team from each group qualified to the semi-finals, while the second-placed team qualified to the 5th-8th place play-off and the third-placed team qualified to the 9th-12th place play-off. The fourth-placed team in group A (which had four teams) was eliminated.

First round

Group A

Group B

Group C

Group D

Classification round

9th-12th places play-off

5th-8th places play-off

Medals round

Semi-finals

3rd-4th place match

Final

Final ranking

References

1973
Maccabiah Games